The Trail to Yesterday is a 1918 American silent Western film directed by Edwin Carewe and starring Bert Lytell and Anna Q. Nilsson. It was produced by and distributed by Metro Pictures. It is based on a novel, The Trail to Yesterday (1913), by Charles Alden Seltzer. A nitrate fragment of the print is held by EYE Institut/Filmmuseum, Netherlands.

Plot
As described in a film magazine, David Langford (Maupain) kills his partner and accuses the son of the murder. A fugitive from justice, Ned Keegles (Lytell) goes out west, determined on revenge. When he meets Sheila Langford (Nilsson), he forces her to marry him, and believes his revenge is complete. When he hears that Langford is Sheila's stepfather, he is sorry. He tells Sheila so and begs for her forgiveness, but his enemies have darkened his character and she is slow to forgive. The attempted murder of Ned's best friend forces him to talk. Sheila comes to understand the true state of affairs and becomes satisfied with her marriage and the forced ceremony.

Cast
 Bert Lytell as Ned "Dakota" Keegles
 Anna Q. Nilsson as Sheila Langford
 Harry S. Northrup as Jack Duncan
 Ernest Maupain as David Langford
 John A. Smiley as Ben Doubler
 Danny Hogan as "Texas" Blanco

Production
Some filming took place at Arivaca, Arizona.

Reception
Like many American films of the time, The Trail to Yesterday was subject to cuts by city and state film censorship boards. For example, the Chicago Board of Censors required cuts, in Reel 3, of Dakota shooting Blanco and his falling and, in Reel 5, of Duncan shooting an old man at the door.

References

External links
 
 
 Seltzer, Charles Alden (1913), The Trail to Yesterday, New York: A. Burt Co., on the Internet Archive

1918 films
1918 Western (genre) films
Films shot in Arizona
Films shot in Tucson, Arizona
Films directed by Edwin Carewe
Films based on American novels
American black-and-white films
Silent American Western (genre) films
1910s American films
1910s English-language films